Timeline is a science fiction novel by American writer Michael Crichton, his twelfth under his own name and twenty-second overall, published in November 1999. It tells the story of a group of history students who travel to 14th-century France to rescue their professor. The book follows in Crichton's long history of combining science, technical details, and action in his books, this time addressing quantum and multiverse theory.

The novel spawned Timeline Computer Entertainment, a computer game developer that created the Timeline PC game published by Eidos Interactive in 2000. Additionally, an eponymous film based on the book was released in 2003.

Plot
In northern Arizona near Corazón Canyon, a married couple driving through the desert encounter an elderly man. They take him to a hospital in Gallup, New Mexico. Hospital staff learn that he works for the company ITC. After he suddenly dies, an MRI reveals that he had unexplainable abnormalities in his blood vessels.

In the Dordogne region of southwest France, Professor Edward Johnston leads a group of archaeologists and historians as they study a site that includes the fourteenth-century towns of Castelgard and La Roque. Suspicious of the detailed knowledge of the site shown by their funds provider ITC, Johnston travels to New Mexico to investigate. During his absence, the researchers make disturbing discoveries in the ruins, including the lens to Johnston's eyeglasses, and a written message from him that is determined to be over 600 years old. Four of the researchers—graduate students Chris Hughes and Kate Erickson, assistant professor André Marek, and technology specialist David Stern—are flown to ITC's research headquarters in Black Rock, New Mexico.

During the flight, ITC vice president John Gordon informs them that Johnston traveled to the year 1357 using their undisclosed quantum technology. After touring the facility and meeting with ITC president Robert Doniger, the historians decide to venture into the past to rescue the professor. Stern chooses to stay behind because the time period is extremely dangerous.

A team consisting of Chris, Kate, Marek and two ITC guards travels to 1357. Soon after they arrive, they are attacked by knights chasing a boy. The ITC guards are killed, and one activates a grenade before he is fatally wounded and initiates his return, causing the present-day transit pad to be severely damaged by the explosion. Stern and the ITC employees struggle to repair it so the team can return home.

Kate and Marek find Johnston at a monastery, but he is soon taken captive by the soldiers of Lord Oliver de Vannes, an English knight and resident lord of Castelgard, who is convinced Johnston knows the secret passageway to the otherwise impregnable castle of La Roque, which Oliver controls. Oliver's enemy, French commander Arnaut de Cervole, plans to attack Oliver's domain, and Oliver wants the secret to defend it.

Separated from the others, Chris follows the boy and inadvertently identifies himself as a nobleman. The "boy" leads Chris to the castle of Castelgard, and is revealed to be Lady Claire d'Eltham in disguise. She is being pressured to marry Sir Guy de Malegant. Chris and Marek (who has since found Chris) are challenged to a joust by Guy: Chris's apparent nobility and him accompanying Lady Claire have turned him into the enemy of Guy. The two survive the challenge thanks to Marek's knowledge of medieval combat.

Oliver orders the historians' imprisonment. They escape Castelgard and are pursued by Sir Robert de Kere, Oliver's advisor. Meanwhile, Oliver relocates to La Roque, taking Johnston with him. In order to rescue Johnston, the historians search for clues to the location of the secret passage to La Roque. After gathering information at the monastery, they find a clue in a water mill, but get captured and interrogated by Arnaut. After escaping Arnaut's forces, Chris and Kate find the entrance to the passage at a decrepit chapel while Marek gains entry into La Roque by posing as Johnston's assistant. Marek learns that the professor is helping Oliver build an incendiary weapon to use against Arnaut's forces, believing that Oliver will lose the siege anyway as he historically does.

The historians have learned that another person from the present is helping Oliver's forces. The person is revealed to be de Kere, who is really Rob Deckard, an ITC employee driven insane from errors in the process of teleporting to another time that built up in his body over multiple trips, much like the elderly man the couple in Arizona found. Deckard plans to prevent the historians' return to the present and kill them.

Chris and Kate use the passage to enter La Roque. Arnaut begins the siege of La Roque, and later enters the castle by apparently using the passage. During the battle, Kate is chased by Guy and sends him falling to his death. Marek and Chris free Johnston from a dungeon. Arnaut duels with Oliver, resulting in Oliver being trapped in a pit of putrid water. As the historians flee, Chris is attacked by Deckard, but kills him by setting him on fire with Johnston's incendiary weapon.

Stern and the ITC employees repair the transit pad just in time for the historians' return. Marek, who has always wanted to live in the Middle Ages, decides to stay behind, while Chris, Kate, and Johnston return to the present.

The historians and Gordon confront Doniger, who had little concern for the travelers' safety and intends to exploit the quantum technology for corporate gain. Gordon renders him unconscious and sends him to 1348 Europe, during the Black Death.

In an epilogue, Chris and Kate are implied to be a couple, and Kate is pregnant. While examining a site in England, the researchers find the graves of Marek and Lady Claire, whom he married. They have bittersweet feelings knowing that Marek had a happy life, but also miss him.

Style

Point of view 

The novel is written in the third-person-omniscient point of view.

Characters

Andre Marek 

Andre Marek is a researcher who works with Professor Johnston in Dordogne. Marek has always had a fascination with medieval times that is so intense that he has taught himself to joust, to fight with a sword, and to shoot a longbow. He also learned to speak and understand medieval languages such as Occitan and Middle English. Therefore, when Marek gets the chance to go to that era, via ITC's invention, he jumps at it.

Marek proves himself very brave in the medieval world. He fights multiple soldiers, not hesitating to take their lives; bravely stands up to medieval warlords and Archpriests; and is very convincing in the role of a knight. No one - not even knights who oppose him - have a doubt about his being one, fully entitled to be called "Sir Andre". Ultimately, Marek realizes that he was meant to live in this period. For this reason, he chooses to remain behind. When Professor Johnston, Kate, and Chris return to their own world, they find Marek's grave and discover that he lived a happy life in that alternate universe.

Kate Erickson 

Kate Erickson began her college career as an architecture student but found it boring and switched her major to history. Kate now works the Dordogne site from the perspective of architecture, examining the ruins to see how they were built and to make recommendations for restoration.

Kate is part of Marek's team that travels to the 14th century to save Professor Johnston. Kate repeatedly demonstrates her bravery and uses her climbing skills to outwit the soldiers of the period. Kate is also something of a romantic and falls in love with Chris during the adventure.

Chris Hughes 

Chris Hughes is a student of Professor Johnston's. Chris’ specialty at the archeological site at Dordogne is the mill; he is trying to determine whether or not the mill was fortified, a feature that was fairly new at the time. When Johnston disappears and Marek asks Chris to be part of the team that rescues him, Chris jumps at the chance.

Chris is something of a weakling who often finds himself getting in difficult situations, usually over women. When he goes to the past, he finds himself lying to a pretty girl to impress her, and his lie causes him to end up having to joust with her potential husband. As time passes, however, Chris proves himself to be much braver than he appears. In fact, he single-handedly kills de Kere, the one man crazy enough to kill Chris' entire team.

Professor Edward Johnston 

Professor Edward Johnston is a college professor who is in charge of the archeological site at Dordogne, in France. Johnston is an inspiration to and supportive of his students, and they admire him. When Johnston goes missing after traveling to New Mexico to confront ITC's CEO, his team rallies to find a way to save him.

Johnston has traveled to the past through a separate universe. He has been found by the local people and for this reason has created a new persona for himself, as a Magister who has come to help the local monastery's abbot look for important information in their archives. In this capacity, Johnston quickly becomes something of a local legend. This causes Sir Oliver to request his help in defeating Arnaut. Johnston plays along until the moment comes when he can return home.

David Stern 

David Stern is a physicist who takes a job with the Dordogne River Valley archeological site just to be close to where his girlfriend is attending school. When Doniger calls Marek and asks him to pick his three best people to return to New Mexico, Marek chooses Stern to be part of the team. When the science behind the ability to transmit people to other universes is discussed, Stern probably understands it better than anyone else and, therefore, is also the only one who recognizes that it is dangerous and chooses not to go. However, by not going, Stern becomes a key part of the team by assuring their survival via his innovations to rebuild the water walls that provide buffer for the re-building team. Stern saves their lives.

Reception
Cahners Business Information says the book will "grab teens' attention from the very first page", and Entertainment Weekly calls Timeline "exhilarating entertainment." The novel has also grasped the attention of scholars of medievalism, since Crichton praises Norman Cantor's  Inventing the Middle Ages (1989) as a central influence on his characterization of academic research on the medieval past. Crichton's narrative seems to support Cantor's notion that the work of academic medievalists amounts to little more than subjective reinventions of the medieval era.

Film adaptation

Paramount Pictures produced a feature film adaptation, with a budget of $80 million, released on November 26, 2003. The adaptation was written by Jeff Maguire and George Nolfi, and directed by Richard Donner, and stars Paul Walker as Chris, Gerard Butler as Marek, Billy Connolly as Professor Johnston, and Frances O'Connor as Kate. The film was poorly received by critics and audiences.

See also

 Hundred Years War

References

External links
 Official Site

Novels about time travel
1999 American novels
1999 science fiction novels
American novels adapted into films
American science fiction novels
Novels by Michael Crichton
Alfred A. Knopf books
Books with cover art by Chip Kidd
Novels about multiple time paths
Quantum fiction novels
Novels set in the 14th century
Hundred Years' War literature
Fictional knights
Third-person narrative novels